is a passenger railway station located in the city of  Kōka, Shiga, Japan operated by the third-sector Shigaraki Kohgen Railway.

Lines

Station layout
The station consists of one side platform serving single bi-directional track. The station's building dates from the Shigaraki Line's opening in 1933, making it the oldest structure on the line. The station is unattended.

Adjacent stations

History
Kumoi Station opened on May 8, 1933 as a station of the Japanese Government Railway (JGR).  The station was closed from October 1, 1943 to July 25, 1947, when it reopened as a station of the Japan National Railway (JNR). The station became part of the West Japan Railway Company on April 1, 1987 due to the privatization and dissolution of the JNR and was transferred to the Shigaraki Kohgen Railway on July 13, 1987.

Passenger statistics

Surrounding area
 Kumoi Elementary School
Japan National Route 307

See also
List of railway stations in Japan

References

External links

Shigaraki Railway home page

Railway stations in Japan opened in 1933
Railway stations in Shiga Prefecture
Kōka, Shiga